Suzana Bricelj (born 3 September 1971) is a Slovene painter and illustrator. Her illustrations appear in children's picture books, journals and magazines for young readers and even school books.

Bricelj was born in Ljubljana in 1971. She graduated from the Academy of Fine Arts in Ljubljana in 1998, after which she attended courses in art schools in Bratislava and Paris. Illustration is her main creative focus.

In 2005 she won the Levstik Award for her illustrations for Mala nočna torta s plameni (A Small Night Cake With Flames) from Toon Tellegen's Cake Book.

Selected Illustrated Works

 Najlepše pravljice 2 (Most Beautiful Fairy Tales 2), 2009
 Mi, kosovirji (We the Cosovirs), written by Svetlana Makarovič, 2009
 Kokokoška Emilija (Emilia the Hen), written by Svetlana Makarovič, 2009
 Miklavž in Miklavžek in druge pravljice (Little Claus and Big Claus and Other Stories), written by Hans Christian Andersen, 2009
 Jelka in druge pravljice (The Fir-Tree and Other Stories), written by Hans Christian Andersen, 2009
 O kralju, ki ni maral pospravljati (About the King Who Didn't Like Tidying Up), written by Nina Mav Hrovat, 2008
 Kosovirja na leteči žlici (The Cosovirs on the Flying Spoon), written by Svetlana Makarovič, 2008
 Gospod in hruška (The Gentleman and the Pear), written by Fran Milčinski, 2007
 Eva in kozel  (Eva and the Goat), written by Majda Koren, 2006
 Kako so nastale gosli (How the Fiddle Was Created), Traditional Romani Tale, 2006
 Mala nočna torta s plameni (A Small Night Cake With Flames), written by Toon Tellegen, 2004
 Družinska pesmarica: 100 slovenskih ljudskih in ponarodelih pesmi (The Family Song Book: 100 Slovene Traditional and Popular Songs), 2002
 Veliki pravljičarji in njihove najlepše pravljice (The Great Storytellers and Their Most Beautiful Stories), 2001
 Katka in Bunkec (Katka and Bunkec), written by Marjan Tomšič, 2000
 Zlato Kralja Matjaža (King Matjaž's Gold), written by Anja Štefan, 1999
 Martin Krpan z Vrha (Martin Krpan from Vrh ), written by Fran Levstik, 1999

References

Slovenian artists
Slovenian illustrators
Living people
1971 births
Artists from Ljubljana
Levstik Award laureates
University of Ljubljana alumni
Slovenian women artists
Slovenian women illustrators
Slovenian children's book illustrators